Brandon Hunt  is an American football executive who is a front office executive for the Philadelphia Eagles of the National Football League (NFL). Prior to serving with the Eagles, Hunt served with both the Pittsburgh Steelers and Houston Texans.

Early life 
Hunt was born in Los Angeles but was raised in Pittsburgh and attended Pine-Richland High School. He also attended Indiana University of Pennsylvania where he was also a graduate assistant.

Front office career

Pittsburgh Steelers (2005-06) 
After serving at IUP as a graduate assistant for a year, Hunt joined the steelers organization as an Intern.

Houston Texans (2007-2009) 
After his internship, the Texans hired him as Pro Scout.

Back at Pittsburgh (2009-2022) 
He was promoted and left for Pittsburgh to be the Pro Scouting Coordinator. A position he served for more than a decade under Kevin Colbert where he was very influential.

Philadelphia Eagles (2022-present) 
After Steelers' General Manager Kevin Colbert resigned and Omar Khan was selected as his replacement instead of Hunt, Hunt joined the Philadelphia Eagles under Howie Roseman to serve as director of scouting.

Personal life 
Hunt is married and has two sons. They live in Pittsburgh.

References

Philadelphia Eagles executives

Living people

Year of birth missing (living people)